An air well or aerial well is a structure or device that collects water by promoting the condensation of moisture from air. Designs for air wells are many and varied, but the simplest designs are completely passive, require no external energy source and have few, if any, moving parts.

Three principal designs are used for air wells, designated as high mass, radiative, and active:
 High-mass air wells: used in the early 20th century, but the approach failed. 
 Low-mass, radiative collectors: Developed in the late 20th century onwards, proved to be much more successful. 
 Active collectors: these collect water in the same way as a dehumidifier; although the designs work well, they require an energy source, making them uneconomical except in special circumstances. New, innovative designs seek to minimise the energy requirements of active condensers or make use of sustainable and  renewable energy resources.

Background

All air well designs incorporate a substrate with a temperature sufficiently low so that dew forms. Dew is a form of precipitation that occurs naturally when atmospheric water vapour condenses onto a substrate. It is distinct from fog, in that fog is made of droplets of water that condense around particles in the air. Condensation releases latent heat which must be dissipated in order for water collection to continue.

An air well requires moisture from the air. Everywhere on Earth, even in deserts, the surrounding atmosphere contains at least some water. According to Beysens and Milimouk: "The atmosphere contains  of fresh water, composed of 98 percent water vapour and 2 percent condensed water (clouds): a figure comparable to the renewable liquid water resources of inhabited lands ." The quantity of water vapour contained within the air is commonly reported as a relative humidity, and this depends on temperature—warmer air can contain more water vapour than cooler air. When air is cooled to the dew point, it becomes saturated, and moisture will condense on a suitable surface. The dew temperature falls to  if the relative humidity is 50 percent.

A related, but quite distinct, technique of obtaining atmospheric moisture is the fog fence.

An air well should not be confused with a dew pond. A dew pond is an artificial pond intended for watering livestock. The name dew pond (sometimes cloud pond or mist pond) derives from the widely held belief that the pond was filled by moisture from the air. In fact, dew ponds are primarily filled by rainwater.

A stone mulch can significantly increase crop yields in arid areas. Despite this, substantial crops can be grown by using a mulch of volcanic stones, a trick discovered after volcanic eruptions in 1730. Some credit the stone mulch with promoting dew; although the idea has inspired some thinkers, it seems unlikely that the effect is significant. Rather, plants are able to absorb dew directly from their leaves, and the main benefit of a stone mulch is to reduce water loss from the soil and to eliminate competition from weeds.

History

Beginning in the early 20th century, a number of inventors experimented with high-mass collectors. Notable investigators were the Russian engineer Friedrich Zibold (sometimes given as Friedrich Siebold), the French bioclimatologist Leon Chaptal, the German-Australian researcher Wolf Klaphake and the Belgian inventor Achille Knapen.

Zibold's collector

In 1900, near the site of the ancient Byzantine city of Theodosia, thirteen large piles of stones were discovered by Zibold who was a forester and engineer in charge of this area. The finds were associated with the remains of  terracotta pipes that apparently led to wells and fountains in the city. Zibold concluded that the stacks of stone were condensers that supplied Theodosia with water and he calculated that each air well produced more than  each day.

The shape of the stone pile allowed a good air flow with only minimal thermal contact between the stones.

Zibold's condenser began to operate in 1912 with a maximum daily production that was later estimated to have been  – Zibold made no public record of his results at the time. The base developed leaks that forced the experiment to end in 1915 and the site was partially dismantled before being abandoned. (The site was rediscovered in 1993 and cleaned up.) Zibold's condenser was approximately the same size as the ancient stone piles that had been found, and although the yield was very much less than the yield Zibold had calculated for the original structures, the experiment was an inspiration for later developers.

Chaptal's collector

Inspired by Zibold's work, Chaptal built a small air well near Montpellier in 1929. Small vent holes ringed the top and bottom of the pyramid. These holes could be closed or opened as required to control the flow of air. The structure was allowed to cool during the night, and then warm moist air was let in during the day. Dew formed on the limestone pieces and collected in a reservoir below ground level.

Chaptal did not consider his experiment a success. When he retired in 1946, he put the condenser out of order, possibly because he did not want to leave an improper installation to mislead those who might later continue studies on air wells.

Klaphake's collectors

Wolf Klaphake was a successful chemist working in Berlin during the 1920s and 1930s. During that time, he tested several forms of air wells in Yugoslavia and on Vis Island in the Adriatic Sea. Klaphake's work was inspired by Zibold and by the works of Maimonides, a known Jewish scholar who wrote in Arabic about 1,000 years ago and who mentioned the use of water condensers in Palestine.

Klaphake experimented with a very simple design: an area of mountain slope was cleared and smoothed with a watertight surface. It was shaded by a simple canopy supported by pillars or ridges. The sides of the structure were closed, but the top and bottom edges were left open. At night the mountain slope would cool, and in the day moisture would collect on and run down the smoothed surface. Although the system apparently worked, it was expensive, and Klaphake finally adopted a more compact design based on a masonry structure. The outer wall was made of concrete to give a high thermal capacity, and the inner surface was made of a porous material such as sandstone. According to Klaphake:

Traces of Klaphake's condensers have been tentatively identified.

In 1935, Wolf Klaphake and his wife Maria emigrated to Australia. The Klaphakes' decision to emigrate was probably primarily the result of Maria's encounters with Nazi authorities; their decision to settle in Australia (rather than, say, in Britain) was influenced by Wolf's desire to develop a dew condenser. As a dry continent, Australia was likely to need alternative sources of fresh water, and the Premier of South Australia, whom he had met in London, had expressed an interest. Klaphake made a specific proposal for a condenser at the small town of Cook, where there was no supply of potable water. At Cook, the railway company had previously installed a large coal-powered active condenser, but it was prohibitively expensive to run, and it was cheaper to simply transport water. However, the Australian government turned down Klaphake's proposal, and he lost interest in the project.

Knapen's aerial well

Beginning in 1930, Knapen's dew tower took 18 months to build; it still stands today, albeit in dilapidated condition. At the time of its construction, the condenser excited some public interest.

Inside there is a massive column made of concrete. At night, the whole structure is allowed to cool, and during the day warm moist air enters the structure via the high apertures, cools, descends, and leaves the building by the lower apertures. Knapen's intention was that water should condense on the cool inner column. In keeping with Chaptal's finding that the condensing surface must be rough and the surface tension must be sufficiently low that the condensed water can drip, the central column's outer surface was studded with projecting plates of slate. The slates were placed nearly vertically to encourage dripping down to a collecting basin at the bottom of the structure. Unfortunately, the aerial well never achieved anything like its hoped-for performance and produced no more than a few litres of water each day.

International Organisation for Dew Utilization

By the end of the twentieth century, the mechanics of how dew condenses were much better understood. The key insight was that low-mass collectors which rapidly lose heat by radiation perform best. A number of researchers worked on this method. In the early 1960s, dew condensers made from sheets of polyethylene supported on a simple frame resembling a ridge tent were used in Israel to irrigate plants. Saplings supplied with dew and very slight rainfall from these collectors survived much better than the control group planted without such aids – they all dried up over the summer. In 1986 in New Mexico condensers made of a special foil produced sufficient water to supply young saplings.

In 1992 a party of French academics attended a condensed matter conference in Ukraine where physicist Daniel Beysens introduced them to the story of how ancient Theodosia was supplied with water from dew condensers. They were sufficiently intrigued that in 1993 they went to see for themselves. They concluded that the mounds that Zibold identified as dew condensers were in fact ancient burial mounds (a part of the necropolis of ancient Theodosia) and that the pipes were medieval in origin and not associated with the construction of the mounds. They found the remains of Zibold's condenser, which they tidied up and examined closely. Zibold's condenser had apparently performed reasonably well, but in fact his exact results are not at all clear, and it is possible that the collector was intercepting fog, which added significantly to the yield. If Zibold's condenser worked at all, this was probably due to fact that a few stones near the surface of the mound were able to lose heat at night while being thermally isolated from the ground; however, it could never have produced the yield that Zibold envisaged.

Fired with enthusiasm, the party returned to France and set up the International Organisation for Dew Utilization (OPUR), with the specific objective of making dew available as an alternative source of water.

OPUR began a study of dew condensation under laboratory conditions; they developed a special hydrophobic film and experimented with trial installations, including a  collector in Corsica. Vital insights included the idea that the mass of the condensing surface should be as low as possible so that it cannot easily retain heat, that it should be protected from unwanted thermal radiation by a layer of insulation, and that it should be hydrophobic, so as to shed condensed moisture readily.

By the time they were ready for their first practical installation, they heard that one of their members, Girja Sharan, had obtained a grant to construct a dew condenser in Kothara, India. In April 2001, Sharan had incidentally noticed substantial condensation on the roof of a cottage at Toran Beach Resort in the arid coastal region of Kutch, where he was briefly staying. The following year, he investigated the phenomenon more closely and interviewed local people. Financed by the Gujarat Energy Development Agency and the World Bank, Sharan and his team went on to develop passive, radiative condensers for use in the arid coastal region of Kutch. Active commercialisation began in 2006.

The plastic film, known as OPUR foil, is hydrophilic and is made from polyethylene mixed with titanium dioxide and barium sulphate.

Types

There are three principal approaches to the design of the heat sinks that collect the moisture in air wells: high mass, radiative and active. Early in the twentieth century, there was interest in high-mass air wells, but despite much experimentation including the construction of massive structures, this approach proved to be a failure.

From the late twentieth century onwards, there has been much investigation of low-mass, radiative collectors; these have proved to be much more successful.

High-mass

The high-mass air well design attempts to cool a large mass of masonry with cool nighttime air entering the structure due to breezes or natural convection. In the day, the warmth of the sun results in increased atmospheric humidity. When moist daytime air enters the air well, it condenses on the presumably cool masonry. None of the high-mass collectors performed well, Knapen's aerial well being a particularly conspicuous example.

The problem with the high-mass collectors was that they could not get rid of sufficient heat during the night – despite design features intended to ensure that this would happen. While some thinkers have believed that Zibold might have been correct after all, an article in Journal of Arid Environments discusses why high-mass condenser designs of this type cannot yield useful amounts of water:

Although ancient air wells are mentioned in some sources, there is scant evidence for them, and persistent belief in their existence has the character of a modern myth.

Radiative

A radiative air well is designed to cool a substrate by radiating heat to the night sky. The substrate has a low mass so that it cannot hold onto heat, and it is thermally isolated from any mass, including the ground. A typical radiative collector presents a condensing surface at an angle of 30° from the horizontal. Such condensers may be conveniently installed on the ridge roofs of low buildings or supported by a simple frame. Although other heights do not typically work quite so well, it may be less expensive or more convenient to mount a collector near to ground level or on a two-story building.

A  radiative condenser illustrated to the left is built near the ground.

Although flat designs have the benefit of simplicity, other designs such as inverted pyramids and cones can be significantly more effective. This is probably because the designs shield the condensing surfaces from unwanted heat radiated by the lower atmosphere, and, being symmetrical, they are not sensitive to wind direction.

New materials may make even better collectors. One such material is inspired by the Namib Desert beetle, which survives only on the moisture it extracts from the atmosphere. It has been found that its back is coated with microscopic projections: the peaks are hydrophilic and the troughs are hydrophobic. Researchers at the Massachusetts Institute of Technology have emulated this capability by creating a textured surface that combines alternating hydrophobic and hydrophilic materials.

Active

Active atmospheric water collectors have been in use since the commercialisation of mechanical refrigeration. Essentially, all that is required is to cool a heat exchanger below the dew point, and water will be produced. Such water production may take place as a by-product, possibly unwanted, of dehumidification. The air conditioning system of the Burj Khalifa in Dubai, for example, produces an estimated  of water each year that is used for irrigating the tower's landscape plantings.

Because mechanical refrigeration is energy intensive, active collectors are typically restricted to places where there is no supply of water that can be desalinated or purified at a lower cost and that are sufficiently far from a supply of fresh water to make transport uneconomical. Such circumstances are uncommon, and even then large installations such as that tried in the 1930s at Cook, South Australia failed because of the cost of running the installation – it was cheaper to transport water over large distances.

In the case of small installations, convenience may outweigh cost. There is a wide range of small machines designed to be used in offices that produce a few litres of drinking water from the atmosphere. However, there are circumstances where there really is no source of water other than the atmosphere. For example, in the 1930s, American designers added condenser systems to airships – in this case the air was that emitted by the exhaust of the engines, and so it contained additional water as a product of combustion. The moisture was collected and used as additional ballast to compensate for the loss of weight as fuel was consumed. By collecting ballast in this way, the airship's buoyancy could be kept relatively constant without having to release helium gas, which was both expensive and in limited supply.

More recently, on the International Space Station, the Zvezda module includes a humidity control system. The water it collects is usually used to supply the Elektron system that electrolyses water into hydrogen and oxygen, but it can be used for drinking in an emergency.

There are a number of designs that minimise the energy requirements of active condensers:

 One method is to use the ground as a heat sink by drawing air through underground pipes. This is often done to provide a source of cool air for a building by means of a ground-coupled heat exchanger (also known as Earth tubes), wherein condensation is typically regarded as a significant problem. A major problem with such designs is that the underground tubes are subject to contamination and difficult to keep clean. Designs of this type require air to be drawn through the pipes by a fan, but the power required may be provided (or supplemented) by a wind turbine.

 Cold seawater is used in the Seawater Greenhouse to both cool and humidify the interior of greenhouse-like structure. The cooling can be so effective that not only do the plants inside benefit from reduced transpiration, but dew collects on the outside of the structure and can easily be collected by gutters.
 Another type of atmospheric water collector makes use of desiccants which adsorb atmospheric water at ambient temperature, this makes it possible to extract moisture even when the relative humidity is as low as 14 percent. Systems of this sort have proved to be very useful as emergency supplies of safe drinking water. For regeneration, the desiccant needs to be heated. In some designs regeneration energy is supplied by the sun; air is ventilated at night over a bed of desiccants that adsorb the water vapour. During the day, the premises are closed, the greenhouse effect increases the temperature, and, as in solar desalination pools, the water vapour is partially desorbed, condenses on a cold part and is collected. Nanotechnology is improving these types of collectors, as well.  One such adsorption-based device collected 0.25 L of water per kg of a metal-organic framework in an exceptionally arid climate with sub-zero dew points (Tempe, Arizona, USA).

 A French company has recently designed a small wind turbine that uses a 30 kW electric generator to power an onboard mechanical refrigeration system to condense water.

See also

Atmospheric water generator
Condensation trap (Solar still)
Dew pond
Fog collection
Fog drip
Groasis Waterboxx
Passive cooling, including fluorescent cooling, which can cool to below the ambient air temperature
Rainwater harvesting
Solar chimney
Water potential
Watermaker

References

Notes

Sources

External links

 
 

Precipitation
Water supply
Hydrology
Appropriate technology
Drinking water
Water and the environment